Nushan may refer to:
 Nushan-e Olya
 Nushan-e Sofla